Everett Glass (July 23, 1891 – March 22, 1966) was an American character actor who appeared in more than eighty films and television shows from the 1940s through the 1960s, including Invasion of the Body Snatchers (1956) and episodes of Adventures of Superman, Lassie, and Perry Mason. He began as a stage actor and had a long career as a theatre director and playwright before coming to Hollywood in his 50s.

Career
Everett William Glass was born in Bangor, Maine and attended Amherst College, where he was on the editorial staff of the Amherst Monthly.  By 1916 he was living in Boston and working as assistant to the Polish emigre director Richard Ordynski in producing Henry IV for the Shakespeare Tercentenery.  In 1917 he was one of the original members of the permanent company of the Greenwich Village Theatre in New York.

In 1926 Glass was in Berkeley, California, where he received rave reviews for his starring role in The Drunkard, a comedy. By 1928 he was directing at the Berkeley Playhouse and in charge of the Wheeler Hall Plays series at the University of California, a position he held into the 1930s.  After 1938 he was also writing as well as directing plays, such as "Princes, Ltd." (a comedy), "Summer Heat", and "Coolhaven" (a horror story).

Glass began his career as a film actor in 1948, with uncredited appearances in four films, and ten more in 1949. His first credited part was in Easy Living (1949).  Glass found more regular work in television, starting with an episode of Family Theatre in 1951, and in the Fireside Theatre (1952), where he played in seven episodes.  He eventually appeared in episodes of dozens of television shows in the 1950s and early 1960s, from The Twilight Zone to Rawhide, usually playing a scientist, judge, elder, or some equally distinguished character role. He retired from acting in 1962 following an appearance on Perry Mason as Carlton Gage in "The Case of the Capricious Corpse." He died in 1966 in Los Angeles.

Selected filmography

 Beyond Glory (1948) – West Point Investigation Board Member (uncredited)
 The Girl from Manhattan (1948) – Committeeman (uncredited)
 Joan of Arc (1948) – Judge Anselene (uncredited)
 The Lucky Stiff (1949) – Henry – Waiter (uncredited)
 Act of Violence (1949) – Hotel Night Clerk (uncredited)
 Alias Nick Beal (1949) – Party Guest (uncredited)
 The Undercover Man (1949) – Judge Allen F. Parker (uncredited)
 The Great Sinner (1949) – Pince-Nez Man at Casino (uncredited)
 The Secret of St. Ives (1949) – Priest (uncredited)
 In the Good Old Summertime (1949) – Doctor (uncredited)
 Easy Living (1949) – Virgil Ryan
 Pinky (1949) – Jeffers Wooley (uncredited)
 The Reckless Moment (1949) – Drug Clerk (uncredited)
 Bride for Sale (1949) – Willie (uncredited)
 And Baby Makes Three (1949) – Minister (uncredited)
 Key to the City (1950) – Elderly Gentleman (uncredited)
 Young Man with a Horn (1950) – Mission Song Leader (uncredited)
 When Willie Comes Marching Home (1950) – Colonel J.W. Hollingsworth (uncredited)
 Tarnished (1950) – Jake Patterson (uncredited)
 Mother Didn't Tell Me (1950) – Reverend (uncredited)
 Rock Island Trail (1950) – Judge (uncredited)
 Father Makes Good (1950) – Proprietor (uncredited)
 The Big Hangover (1950) – Alumni Dinner Headwaiter (uncredited)
 Destination Moon (1950) – Mr. La Porte (uncredited)
 The Petty Girl (1950) – Prof. Haughton (uncredited)
 The Killer That Stalked New York (1950) – Elderly Doctor (uncredited)
 Two Flags West (1950) – Rev. Simpkins (uncredited)
 Two Weeks with Love (1950) – Mr. Hibbs (uncredited)
 Counterspy Meets Scotland Yard (1950) – Hugo Borin aka Dr. Victor Ritter
 The Magnificent Yankee (1950) – Justice Peckham (uncredited)
 The Thing from Another World (1951) – Dr. Wilson (uncredited)
 My Forbidden Past (1951) – Elderly Doctor (uncredited)
 Best of the Badmen (1951) – Doctor (uncredited)
 A Millionaire for Christy (1951) – Dr. Whipple (uncredited)
 Journey Into Light (1951) – Deacon Adams
 Flight to Mars (1951) – Montar (uncredited)
 Too Young to Kiss (1951) – Village Druggist (uncredited)
 The Greatest Show on Earth (1952) – Board Member (uncredited)
 Deadline – U.S.A. (1952) – Doctor Emanuel (uncredited)
 Macao (1952) – Garcia (uncredited)
 Belles on Their Toes (1952) – Faculty Member (uncredited)
 Paula (1952) – Professor (uncredited)
 The Girl in White (1952) – Dean (uncredited)
 Three for Bedroom "C" (1952) – Dr. Radcliffe (uncredited)
 Dreamboat (1952) – George Bradley (uncredited)
 O. Henry's Full House (1952) – Desk Clerk (uncredited)
 The Merry Widow (1952) – Putney (uncredited)
 Horizons West (1952) – Judge Smithers (uncredited)
 Call Me Madam (1953) – Announcer at Sally's Party (uncredited)
 Inferno (1953) – Mason, Carson's Butler (uncredited)
 Three Sailors and a Girl (1953) – Bank Client (uncredited)
 Demetrius and the Gladiators (1954) – Kaeso (uncredited)
 Day of Triumph (1954) – Annas
 The Purple Mask (1955) – Father Brochard
 Trial (1955) – George – Law School Dean (uncredited)
 Invasion of the Body Snatchers (1956) – Dr. Ed Pursey
 World Without End (1956) – Timmek
 The Harder They Fall (1956) – Minister (uncredited)
 Friendly Persuasion (1956) – Brother Amos – Elder (uncredited)
Alfred Hitchcock Presents TV series. Episode: "Place Of Shadows" (1956) - Br Giles
 The Quiet Gun (1957) – Circuit Judge (uncredited)
 Pal Joey (1957) – Pet Store Owner (uncredited)
 Gunman's Walk (1958) – The Reverend Arthur Stotheby (uncredited)
 A Summer Place (1959) – Dean (uncredited)
 Elmer Gantry (1960) – Rev. Brown (uncredited)
 The Marriage-Go-Round (1961) – Older Professor (uncredited)
 Susan Slade (1961) – Mr. White (uncredited)

References
New York Times – March 10, 1912, p. X8  "Amherst Juniors Entertain"
New York Times – February 20, 1916 "Delta U Players to give Henry IV"
New York Times – November 1, 1917
Berkeley Daily Gazette – November 16, 1926,  Review of "The Drunkard"
Berkeley Daily Gazette – April 4, 1928.  p. 10
New York Times – July 4, 1938
New York Times – July 30, 1942
Chicago Tribune – July 28, 1940
New York Times – July 24, 1948

External links

1891 births
1966 deaths
20th-century American dramatists and playwrights
20th-century American male actors
American male film actors
American male stage actors
Amherst College alumni
People from Bangor, Maine